Stabschef ("Chief of Staff") was an office and paramilitary rank in the Sturmabteilung (SA), the paramilitary stormtroopers associated with the Nazi Party. It was a rank and position held by the operating chief of the SA. The rank is equivalent to the rank of Generaloberst in the German Army and to General in the US Army.

Definition
The position of SA-Stabschef, not yet a rank, was established in 1929 to assist the Oberste SA-Führer (Supreme SA Leader) with the administration of the fast-growing organization. Otto Wagener held the office under Oberste SA-Führer Franz Pfeffer von Salomon from 1928 to 1930, and effectively headed the SA from Hitler's assumption of the title Oberste SA-Führer in August until Ernst Röhm replaced him in January 1931.

The actual SA rank of Stabschef was created by Röhm for himself in 1933 after Hitler became chancellor. Although Hitler became the supreme commander of the SA in 1930, the day-to-day running of the organization was left to the chief of staff. Thus, the men who held the rank of Stabschef after 1930 were the actual leaders of the SA.

Office holders
The office of Stabschef was held by four different people between 1929 and 1945 and was, in all but the first case of succession, inherited due to the death of a predecessor. The following SA officers held the office of Stabschef:

Insignia
Early insignia for Stabschef consisted of an oak leaf patch worn on the collar of the stormtrooper uniform.  Photographic evidence shows Ernst Röhm wearing such an insignia in his early days as the SA Chief of Staff.  As Röhm's authority increased, so did his insignia and by mid 1931 photographic evidence shows him wearing wreathed star that was designed after that of a Bolivian General's collar, due to Röhm's previous military experience as a military adviser in Bolivia.

After 1933, the insignia for Stabschef consisted of a "crossed lances" pattern, wreathed by a half oak leaf circle.  After 1934, the insignia was changed to a wreathed tri-foil oak leaf pattern similar to the SS rank insignia of Reichsführer-SS. With the fall of Nazi Germany, the Sturmabteilung ceased to exist and with it the Stabschef.

Notes

See also 
 List of senior officers of the Sturmabteilung

References

Bibliography 

 
 
 
 
 

Sturmabteilung
Nazi paramilitary ranks